Helmut Schön (15 September 1915 – 23 February 1996) was a German football player and manager. He is best remembered for his exceptional career as manager of the West Germany national team in four consecutive World Cup tournaments, including winning the title in 1974, losing in the final in 1966, and coming in third in 1970. In addition, his teams won the European Championship in 1972 and lost in the final in 1976.

Biography 
Schön played as a striker for Dresdner SC, winning the German football championship in 1943 and 1944 as well as the cup in 1941 and 1942. He appeared 16 times for his country between 1937 and 1941, scoring 17 goals.
After World War II he began his career in football management in his native state of Saxony, then part of Soviet-occupied East Germany. He was in charge of coaching selections from Saxony and the Soviet occupation zone before political interference to the sport made him flee to Western Germany in 1950. Having played in Hamburg for FC St. Pauli even during his Friedrichstadt spell, he now was appointed player-coach with Hertha BSC Berlin where he had several former teammates in his squad but left before the end of the season. Schön became a licensed coach in Cologne before managing Wiesbaden. Between 1952 and 1956, he was in charge of the then-independent Saarland side, who met West Germany in qualification for the 1954 World Cup. When the Saarland was reunified with West Germany in 1956, Schön joined the West Germany national side as assistant to Sepp Herberger, whom he succeeded as manager in November 1964.

Under Schön's leadership the West German teams were World Cup runners-up in 1966 (lost 4–2 to England in the final), third in the World Cup of 1970, European champions in 1972 (defeated the Soviet Union 3–0 in the final), World Cup winners in 1974 (defeated the Netherlands 2–1 in the final), and European Championship runners-up in 1976 (lost to Czechoslovakia in the final on penalty kicks, after extra-time). Among the moves Schön made that enabled West Germany's triumphs in 1972 and 1974 were: selecting Sepp Maier as his automatic first string goalkeeper, a decision that seems obvious in retrospect but was not a given at the time; easing many of the veterans of the 1970 team out of the subsequent squad; allowing Franz Beckenbauer to play his preferred role as a sweeper, and appointing him team captain; introducing young fullbacks Berti Vogts and Paul Breitner into the team; building the midfield around Günter Netzer and switching the team's formation to better accommodate his skills; then replacing Netzer with Wolfgang Overath in the 1974 team.

Schön holds World Cup records for both coaching the most matches (25) and the most wins (16), and was the first coach to win both a World Cup and a European Championship.  He shares with England's Walter Winterbottom the distinction of managing the same national team at four consecutive World Cup tournaments. Schön gave notice that he would retire after the 1978 World Cup, to be replaced by his assistant Jupp Derwall. He was unable to go out on a high note as his team was knocked out of the competition by Austria, who had already been eliminated. During his 14-year tenure as national coach, his record was 87 victories, 30 draws and 22 defeats in 139 matches. For his contributions to association football as a coach, Schön became one of the inaugural recipients of the FIFA Order of Merit in 1984.

Managerial honours
West Germany
 FIFA World Cup: 1974; runner-up: 1966; third-place: 1970
 UEFA European Championship: 1972; runner-up: 1976

Individual
World Soccer 22nd Greatest Manager of All Time: 2013

References

External links

 
 
 
 

1915 births
1996 deaths
German footballers
Dresdner SC players
Hertha BSC players
Germany international footballers
German football managers
West German football managers
1966 FIFA World Cup managers
1970 FIFA World Cup managers
1974 FIFA World Cup managers
1978 FIFA World Cup managers
FIFA World Cup-winning managers
Saarland national football team managers
Germany national football team managers
UEFA Euro 1972 managers
UEFA Euro 1976 managers
UEFA European Championship-winning managers
History of sport in East Germany
Footballers from Dresden
Commanders Crosses of the Order of Merit of the Federal Republic of Germany
Association football forwards
East German emigrants to West Germany